Mikhail Tszyunovich Ge (born 17 May 1991) is an Uzbekistani former competitive figure skater. He is the 2017 Internationaux de France bronze medalist. In addition to this, he has won nine international medals and four Uzbekistan national titles. He has finished in the top-ten at six ISU Championships, including two World Championships (2015 and 2018), competed at the 2014 Winter Olympics and the 2018 Winter Olympics, finishing 17th in both competitions.

Personal life 
Misha Ge was born in Moscow, Russian SFSR to skating coaches Larisa and Jun Ge. He is of Russian, Chinese, and Korean descent. From the age of about 10, he lived in Beijing, China, where his parents coached. Ge also resided in Hong Kong SAR, Mainland China and Taiwan (ROC). He moved to the United States in mid-2009 and returned to Beijing in 2013. He speaks Russian, Mandarin Chinese, and English. Ge has taken choreography courses at the Beijing Dance Academy and the Hollywood Dance Academy.

Career

As a competitor 
Having first stepped onto the ice at age three and a half, Misha Ge began training seriously at ten after moving to China. From 2009, he trained in the United States. He started representing Uzbekistan in 2010.

Ge finished 6th at the 2011 Asian Winter Games and 12th at the 2011 Four Continents. He trained in Lake Arrowhead, California with Frank Carroll as his jump coach.

In 2011–12, Ge won silver medals at the Asian Trophy, Ice Challenge, and Istanbul Cup. He was 9th at the 2012 Four Continents.

Ge placed 16th at the 2013 World Championships in London, Ontario. His result earned Uzbekistan a men's entry at the 2014 Winter Olympics. Beijing became Ge's main training base in 2013. In autumn of that year, he received his first Grand Prix assignment, the 2013 Rostelecom Cup. In February 2014, Ge competed at the Winter Olympics in Sochi and finished 17th.

Ge placed 5th at the 2014 Cup of China and 4th at the 2014 Rostelecom Cup. Later during the season, he earned two top-ten placements at the ISU Championships. He placed 8th at the 2015 Four Continents in Seoul (7th in the short, 9th in the free), and 6th at the 2015 World Championships in Shanghai (8th in SP, 7th in FS).

Ge received two 2015–16 Grand Prix assignments but had to withdraw from one, the 2015 Trophée Éric Bompard, due to a visa issue. He finished 8th at the 2015 Cup of China. In October, he won gold at an ISU Challenger Series event, the 2015 CS Denkova-Staviski Cup. Throughout the season, he was hampered by a left ankle injury, which was caused by executing quad jumps.

In 2016–17, he had to compete with an injured left ankle, which was not healed properly. In March 2017, he announced that he might retire from competition at the end of the season.

He decided to continue competing in 2017–18 season. Ge received two 2017–18 Grand Prix assignments. At 2018 Rostelecom Cup, he finished 4th. His next assignment was 2017 Internationaux de France where he placed 3rd and won the bronze medal behind Javier Fernández and Shoma Uno. This was the first time he medaled at a Grand Prix event. At the 2018 Four Continents in Taipei, he placed 6th. In February 2018, Ge then competed at the 2018 Winter Olympics. He placed 14th in the short program and 17th in the free program to finish 17th overall. At the 2018 World Figure Skating Championships, he was 8th in the short program and 9th in the free program. He finished the competition in 9th place, his second top ten finish at Worlds after the 2015 World Championships. He announced his retirement after the competition.

As a choreographer 
In addition to his competitive career, Ge has choreographed skating programs for himself and other skaters. His clients include:

 Karen Chen
 Artur Dmitriev Jr.
 Amber Glenn
 Gracie Gold
 Rika Hongo
 Maxim Kovtun
 Evgenia Medvedeva
 Alexia Paganini
 Alexander Petrov
 Anna Pogorilaya
 Kevin Reynolds
 Elena Radionova
 Kazuki Tomono
 Elizaveta Tuktamysheva
 Elizabet Tursynbaeva
 Sergei Voronov

Programs

Competitive highlights
 GP: Grand Prix; CS: Challenger Series

Detailed results
Small medals for short and free programs awarded only at ISU Championships.

References

External links 

 
 

1991 births
Uzbekistani male single skaters
Living people
Figure skaters from Moscow
Figure skaters at the 2014 Winter Olympics
Figure skaters at the 2018 Winter Olympics
Olympic figure skaters of Uzbekistan
Figure skaters at the 2011 Asian Winter Games
Figure skaters at the 2017 Asian Winter Games
Asian Games competitors for Uzbekistan
Uzbekistani people of Russian descent
Uzbekistani people of Korean descent
Uzbekistani people of Chinese descent
Russian people of Korean descent
Russian sportspeople of Chinese descent
Figure skating choreographers